Gilbert Richard Duaramuri (born on January 6, 1993) is an Indonesian footballer who currently plays for Persija in the Indonesia Super League.

References

External links
 

Living people
1993 births
People from Jayapura
Papuan people
Association football midfielders
Indonesian footballers
Persija Jakarta players
Liga 1 (Indonesia) players
Sportspeople from Papua